Bhood is a village in Khanapur tehsil of Sangli district in Maharashtra, India.   It is located near the city Vita.

The population of Bhood is 1,889 according to the 2011 Census,
with agriculture being the prime occupation of the village's residents. Some residents are also employed at a Gold Refinery and the Jewellery business. Bhood is recipient of the Nirmal Gram Purskar in Sant Gadage Baba Gram Swachata Abhiyan.

Climate

The village has a semi arid, hot and dry climate consisting of mainly three seasons. Summers are long, ranging almost five months from mid February to June. Temperatures in summer fall between 35 °C (95 °F) - 40 °C (104 °F). However, it may reach higher than 40 °C in searching summer. May is the hottest month of a year with an average day temperature of 37 °C (98.6 °F) in the village. Winters are short with temperatures ranging within 15 °C (59 °F) - 21 °C (69.8 °F). December is the coldest month in a year. Relative humidity in winter is the lowest and December is the driest month in a year with the relative humidity as low as 30%. Rains are scarce and occur only during the Monsoon from mid June to September. Annual average rainfall is about 25.5 inches (647.7 mm). September gets the maximum rainfall in a year while July has the maximum rainy days.

Location

Government and politics

Local administration
The Grampanchayat Bhood is the administrative body for the village which is directly responsible for the affairs within the village. The village has been divided into 3 Wards, each ward has its 3 elected representatives called 'Gramsadasy' or 'punch'. The gramsadasy elect the 'Sirpunch' of the Grampanchayat which is head of the Grampanchayat. The Grampanchayat elections are held after every five years. The Grampanchayat Bhood is working with Zilla Parishad, Sangli and Panchayat samiti, Vita. Bhood is under the Lengare division for Zilla parishad, Sangli and Panchayat samiti, Vita.

State and central administration
Bhood is under the Pune division. Pune division is one of the six administrative divisions of Maharashtra state in India.
Bhood is under the Sangli Lok Sabha constituency and Khanapur-Atpadi Vidhan Sabha constituency. MDDS e-Governance code for Bhood is 27 531 04299 568523.

Judiciary
Bhood is under the jurisdictional area of Bombay High Court. District level court is in Sangli (Sangli district court). And tehsil level court is in Vita. The village is under the working area of Vita police station.

Transportation

Road
Bhood is at a distance of 275 km south-west of Mumbai, 73 km north of Sangli and 18 km from Vita. The nearest villages and towns are Khanapur (10 km), Lengare, and Kharsundi (13 km). Bhood has bus stand served by the buses of Maharashtra State Road Transport Corporation.

Railway
Nearest railway station is Karad (55 km). Miraj railway junction is 65 km from Bhood. Trains to all major cities in India are available from Karad and Miraj railway stations.

Air
Nearest domestic airport from Bhood is Kolhapur (90 km). Kolhapur airport located at Ujalaiwadi, 9 km South-east from the Kolhapur city. Its sole regular service to Mumbai by Kingfisher Airlines ceased in November 2011 when the airline pulled out of several towns like Kolhapur due to its financial crisis. Pune Airport located at a distance of  175 km by road from Bhood is the nearest functional airport. It has regular service to all major cities in India.

Demographics

Bhood has a population of 1,889. With the male population at 898 and the female at 991. There are 1,104 females per 1,000 males in the village amongst 455 households. People of various ethnic groups live in Bhood.

The census code for Bhood is 04328200 and its village code according to 2011 Census is 27 35 005 0025.

Because of its gold-refinery and jewellery business many people of Bhood are today spread throughout India. According to 1991 Census, the population of Bhood was 1395.

Places of worship

There are number of temples in Bhood. Some of them are...
Bhoodsiddhanath Temple
Mhaswadsidhanatha Temple
Maruti Temple
Jyotiba Temple
Khandoba Temple

Education

Schools
Zila Parishad School provides primary education from class 1 to class 7. The school is governed by the Zilla Parishad of Sangli with the help of the local Panchayat samiti of Vita and the Gram panchayat of Bhood. The school is located near S.T. Stand of Bhood and is equipped with educational facilities.
New English School provides secondary education from class 8 up to class 10 (matriculation level). The school is affiliated to the S.S.C. Board. It is situated near the Bhood-Khanapur road.

Colleges
Higher education is available in the colleges in the following localities of Bhood:

Gallery

See also

Tembhu Irrigation Project

References

External links

BHOOD (Gram Panchayat) Portal by Department of Panchayati Raj  Government of Maharashtra
Information about Bhood from gloriousindia.com
Village profile from indiastudychannel.com

Villages in Sangli district